Hoseynabad (also Romanized as Ḩoseynābād; also known as Hosein Abad) is a village in Bampur-e Sharqi Rural District, in the Central District of Bampur County, Sistan and Baluchestan Province, Iran. At the 2006 census, its population was 1,166, in 211 families.

References 

Populated places in Bampur County